Eastpost Spire is a peak in the Purcell Mountains of the Columbia Mountains in southeastern British Columbia, Canada. 
Eastpost Spire lies just to the East of Bugaboo and Snowpatch Spires.

References

Two-thousanders of British Columbia
Columbia Valley
Purcell Mountains
Kootenay Land District